Ellychnia simplex is a species of firefly in the genus Ellychnia.

References

Lampyridae